Duki is a district in the Balochistan province of Pakistan. It is located at an altitude of 1092 metres (3585 feet). It is sub-divided into union councils, mainly Vialla Duki, Zangal Rabat, Sadar, Civil Station, Nasarbad, Thal, Luni and Nana Sahib Ziarat. Its main revenue comes from agriculture and natural resources. Being a tribal society it has tribes: Tareens including Raisani, Kakar Shadozai, Nasars, Lunis. Duki is one of the least developed districts of Pakistan, not only lagging behind in development, but also health, education, infrastructure and many other facilities. It is the only district where two polio cases were reported in 2018. The prominent tribal leaders of Duki are Sardar Israr Tareen (MNA), Sardar Yaqoob Nasar, Sardar Masood Ali Khan Looni (MPA) Sardar Shafiq Tareen (Senator), and Major Ali Muhammad Shadozai. Duki was made a district in 2016 and its sub-divisions are Thal, Nana Sahib Ziarat, and Luni.

Demographics
At the time of the 2017 census the district had a population of 152,977, of which 10,042 (6.56%) lived in urban areas. Duki district had a sex ratio of 865 females per 1000 males and a literacy rate was 28.65% - 40.68% for males and 14.58% for females. 56,255 (36.77%) were under 10 years of age. 206 people in the district were from religious minorities.

At the time of the 2017 census, 85.86% of the population spoke Pashto, 6.41% Balochi, 2.86% Brahui and 1.06% Saraiki as their first language.

Education 
The literacy rate is 30% of the population and the same is due to the private Educational Institution Especially Nizami School and some others while female literacy rate is below 10% and here the same is due to the Religious Centres i.e. Madrasas Especially Jamia Nizamiyah LilBanat and others.

Revenue record reveals that Duki is the only subdivision in entire Zhob Division that is a settled area. Duki is also the hottest place in the entire administrative division, and is a major coal deposit.

References

 
Geography of Balochistan, Pakistan
Districts of Balochistan, Pakistan
Populated places in Duki District